Anthony Lindsay Caplin (born 1951 in Southport, Lancashire), a son of Abram Caplin and Vera Doris Benjamin. He is a British company director and former chief operating officer of the United Kingdom's Conservative Party.

In 2009 it was suggested that he should be appointed a peer.

He was appointed to the Public Works Loan Board by the Labour government in 2003 and was made chairman by Prime Minister David Cameron in July 2013. The board is responsible for lending money to local authorities for infrastructure projects and collecting the repayments. He resigned from this position in 2014 after it emerged he had failed to disclose being declared bankrupt in 2012.

Former appointments
Positions that Caplin has previously held include:

Chairman of William Clowes Ltd.
Chairman of stockbrokers Panmure Gordon, from January 17, 2002 until September 30, 2009
Board of the Medical Research Council 
Chair of North West London Hospitals NHS Trust until January 2013
Chair of Ealing Hospital NHS Trust
Advisor of ITI Energy Limited
Non-Executive Chairman of Energy Technique plc until February 21, 2007
Acting Chief Executive Officer of Disenco Energy plc from May 2008 to March 16, 2009, Chairman until March 16, 2009
Chairman, Director Durlacher
Managing Director of Manchester News Ltd
President of Pacific Telesis
Chief Executive of First City GB
Chief Executive of Hunterprint plc
Non-Executive Chairman of Urban Wimax Limited
Chairman of Era plc
Chairman of ANT Ltd from October 2002
Non-executive chairman of G.S.Technologies Ltd
Board of Norprint Ltd
Board of Coppice Allupack Ltd
Non-Executive Chairman of Dynamic Commercial Finance plc until August 2004
Chairman of iRevolution Group plc since July 27, 2000
Chairman of Totally plc
Chairman of Financial Development Corporation plc
Chairman of Alternative Networks plc from January 18, 2010 to May 18, 2012
Non-Executive Chairman of Gladstone plc from July 11, 2005 to June 30, 2006
Deputy Chairman of Northamber plc until December 17, 2010
Director of Edengame
Director of Jasmin plc
Director of Ultramind plc
Non-Executive Director of Hand Picked Hotels Ltd
Director on the Advisory Panel of Inflexion Private Equity Partners LLP
Chairman of the European Electronic Messaging Association
Non-Executive Director of Vaccinogen Inc
Director of Alternative Networks plc from April 2001 to May 16, 2012
Independent Non-Executive Director of Endeavors plc (alternate name Tadpole Technology plc) from October 10, 2000 to February 2005.
Senior independent non-executive director of Easynet Group plc
Non-executive director of Dynamic Commercial Finance plc
Non-executive chairman of Biscuit Internet Ltd
Director of 2020Me Holdings Limited 
Director of IEQ plc
Director of Bibliotech Holdings plc
Director of Computer Monitoring Services Limited 1984

References

British businesspeople
Conservative Party (UK) officials
Living people
1951 births